This article includes the professional credits of Michael McCarthy. Listed are all the professional credits, for each category, in chronological order.

Opera

Musical theatre

Other theatre

Concerts and special events

Television and radio

Discography

References 

Irish male musical theatre actors
Irish male stage actors
People from Cork (city)